Peplow is a village in Shropshire, England. 

Peplow may also refer to:

 Billy Peplow (1885–?), English professional footballer
 Chloe Peplow (born 1998), English football midfielder
 Steve Peplow (born 1949), English former footballer
 Ron Peplow (1935–2019), English former professional football
 Peplow Hall, house in Shropshire
 Peplow railway station, station in Peplow, Shropshire, England
 F. J. Peplow (died 1935), librarian and philatelist